Ozzie Devrish is an Australian actor, director and producer, originally from Melbourne. He began acting in 2000 after suffering injury as a professional AFL player. One of his first roles was Crocodile Dundee in Los Angeles. His fame came with an Australian TV series The Strip, following feature films such as Peter Pan, Chronicles of Narnia, The Condemned and many more prestigious productions that has enjoyed critical acclaim and international visibility. He demands the attention of elite casting directors in Hollywood and around the globe.

Film work credits

 Chameleon 3: Dark Angel (2000, TV Movie) as Smuggler
 Crocodile Dundee in Los Angeles (2001) as Villain
 The Lost World (2001, TV Movie)  as Kings Guest
 Peter Pan (2003) Pirate
 Perfect (2004) as Pirate
 Aquamarine (2006) as Carnie
 Redemption 101 (2007) as Linus
 The Condemned (2007) as Russian Prison Guard
 El pistolero del diablo (2007 Short) as Biker
 Sea Patrol (2008, TV Series) Hidden Agendas as Bar Owner
 A Vigilante (2008) as Jack
 The Strip (2008, TV Series) 8 Episodes as Vladimir 
 I.C.U. (2009) as The Pimp
 The Dark Lurking (2009) as Kirkland
 Inseparable Coil (2009 Short) as Prison Inmate
 The Deposit (2010 Short) as Clive Spencer
 The Chronicles of Narnia: The Voyage of the Dawn Treader (2010) as Slaver
 Blood and Relics (2010 Short) as The Veteran
 A Girl Like U (2011 Short) as Garage Guy
 The Jay Larkins Paralympic Program (2011 Short) as Ozzie
 Slide (2011, TV series) Episode #1.10 as Roadie 
 Undergrad (2011 Short) as Mr. Harrison
 Loyalty (2011) as Creed
 The Telemarketers Show (2012 TV series) The New Office as Oz 
 The Sleeping Warrior (2012) as Gary
 Chto tvoryat muzhchiny! (2013) as Mitch
 Alien Sons (2013) as Christo
 Mega Shark vs. Mecha Shark (2014) as Fisherman
 Ready 2 Die (2014) as XCon
 Dance-Off (2014) as Jim
 Low Life (2014 TV series) "Booze" as Ozzie 
 Chto tvoryat muzhchiny! 2 (2015) as Drug Dealer
 Bosch (2015 TV series) Chapter Two: Lost Light as Convict 
 Mega Shark vs. Kolossus (2015) as Leader
 Despair Sessions (2015) as Ray
 Promoted (2015) as Rusty
 Apparitions (2015) as Sarge
 Damn Foreigners (2015) as Inmate
 Aiyai: Wrathful Soul (2019) as Tom
 Bastion (2020) as The Taxman
 Troppo (2022 TV series) 6 Episodes as Sketchy
 Hoodlumzs (2023) as Snake

Awards and honors
ASIN: Nominated Best Actor in a Lead Role, for The Deposit (2010)
ASIN: Winner as Members Choice, for The Deposit (2010)
ASIN: Nominated Best Actor for Aiyai: Wrathful Soul (2021)

References

External links
 
 http://www.28dayslateranalysis.com/2011/12/alien-undead-dark-lurking-and-when.html
 http://www.rottentomatoes.com/celebrity/ozzie_devrish/

Australian male actors
Living people
Year of birth missing (living people)